Air Montserrat Ltd. was a former locally owned Aircraft Charter Service Operation Company operated and maintained by Trans Anguilla Airways (2000) Ltd. Air Montserrat was based on the island of Montserrat and began operation in October 2006. Air Montserrat offered charter services to neighbouring islands, sightseeing tours, medical evacuation, executive/corporative air transport, cargo lifts and more in its Britten Norman Islander.

Services
It operated charter flights from Montserrat to Antigua four times daily, and had plans to add flights to other islands including St. Kitts, Nevis, Guadeloupe and St. Maarten.

In 2007 the airline's website was changed to state "Because we were unable to provide our customers with the high level of service that we previously anticipated, Air Montserrat has ceased further operation."

The airline is now defunct. It ceased all operations in 2007.

Brief history
This is not the first airline to be based on Montserrat. Before the island's W. H. Bramble Airport closed in 1997, it was home to Montserrat Airways. Also in 1956 charter flights from an airstrip in Olveston (a village in Montserrat) were started. This charter service later became the Leeward Islands Air Transport (LIAT).

References

Defunct airlines of Montserrat
Airlines established in 2006
Airlines disestablished in 2007
2006 establishments in Montserrat
2007 disestablishments in Montserrat